Janko Zwycięzca is a 1921 Polish silent film comedy directed by Gustaw Cybulski.

Cast
Henryk Małkowski	... 	Jas Czyzyk
Jadwiga Doliwa	... 	Magda
Gustaw Cybulski... 	Plutonowy Brys
Stanisława Kamińska

External links 
 

1921 films
Polish silent films
Polish black-and-white films
1921 comedy films
Polish comedy films
1920s Polish-language films